Wilson's indigobird (Vidua wilsoni) or the pale-winged indigobird, is a species of bird in the family Viduidae. It is found in Cameroon, Central African Republic, Chad, Republic of the Congo, Democratic Republic of the Congo, Ivory Coast, Ghana, Guinea, Guinea-Bissau, Nigeria, Senegal, South Sudan, and Togo.

See also
Vidua

References

Wilson's indigobird
Birds of West Africa
Birds of Sub-Saharan Africa
Wilson's indigobird
Taxonomy articles created by Polbot